Ita River may refer to:
Itã River, a river in northern Brazil
Ita River (Russia), a river in Debyossky District of the Udmurt Republic, Russia